Erding – Ebersberg is an electoral constituency (German: Wahlkreis) represented in the Bundestag. It elects one member via first-past-the-post voting. Under the current constituency numbering system, it is designated as constituency 213. It is located in southern Bavaria, comprising the districts of Erding and Ebersberg.

Erding – Ebersberg was created for the 2005 federal election. Since 2013, it has been represented by Andreas Lenz of the Christian Social Union (CSU).

Geography
Erding – Ebersberg is located in southern Bavaria. As of the 2021 federal election, it comprises the districts of Erding and Ebersberg.

History
The 2005 federal redistribution saw Bavaria allocated an additional constituency. Erding – Ebersberg was created from parts of the constituencies of Freising, Altötting, and München-Land. In the 2005 election, it was constituency 215 in the numbering system. In the 2009 and 2013 elections, it was number 214. Since the 2017 election, it has been number 213. Its borders have not changed since its creation.

Members
The constituency was first represented by Maximilian Lehmer of the Christian Social Union (CSU) from 2005 to 2013. Andreas Lenz was elected in 2013, and re-elected in 2017 and 2021.

Election results

2021 election

2017 election

2013 election

2009 election

References

Federal electoral districts in Bavaria
2005 establishments in Germany
Constituencies established in 2005
Erding (district)
Ebersberg (district)